Ramble at the Ryman is a 2011 live album recorded by American rock multi-instrumentalist Levon Helm during his September 17, 2008 performance at Nashville's Ryman Auditorium. The performance kicked off the beginning of the Americana Music Festival & Conference. The album features six songs by The Band and other cover material, including songs from previous Helm solo releases. Helm's band is led by multi-instrumentalist Larry Campbell and Helm's daughter, vocalist and mandolinist Amy Helm.

The performance recorded for the album is a traveling version of Helm's Midnight Ramble, usually held at his home and studio in Woodstock, New York.

The album won the 2012 Grammy Award for Best Americana Album. Helm previously won this award for his 2009 studio album Electric Dirt.

Track listing

Personnel
Levon Helm – vocals, mandolin, drums
Larry Campbell – acoustic guitar, electric guitar, fiddle, mandolin, vocals
Teresa Williams – acoustic guitar, vocals
Paul Ossola – bass
Tony Leone – drums 
Amy Helm – mandolin, drums, vocals
Brian Mitchell – organ, piano, accordion, vocals
George Receli – percussion
Erik Lawrence – saxophone
Jay Collins – saxophone
Clark Gaytons – trombone, tuba
Steven Bernstein – trumpet 
Billy Bob Thornton – vocals
John Hiatt – vocals, acoustic guitar 
Sheryl Crow – vocals, autoharp
Buddy Miller – vocals, guitar
Sammy Davis – vocals, harmonica 
Sam Bush – vocals, mandolin
Richard Dodd – mastering
Justin Guip – mixing
Michael Davis – mixing
Carrie Smith – art direction
Paul Laraia – cover photograph
Barbara O'Brien – associate producer 
John O'Neill – associate producer

References

2011 live albums
Albums produced by Larry Campbell (musician)
Levon Helm live albums
Vanguard Records live albums
Grammy Award for Best Americana Album